Roberto Urdaneta Arbeláez (27 June 1890 – 20 August 1972) was a Colombian Conservative party politician and lawyer who served as President of Colombia from November 1951 until June 1953, while President Laureano Gómez was absent due to health issues.

Biographic data 
Urdaneta was born in Bogotá on 27 June 1890, during the administration of President Carlos Holguín Mallarino, his future father in law. He died in the same city on August 20, 1972. Urdaneta married Clemencia Holguín y Caro on 3 June 1917, with whom he had five children.

Urdaneta initiated his education in Bogotá. He then traveled to Bilbao, Spain, where he completed his high school education. Afterwards, he went to Salamanca, where he studied jurisprudence and obtained a degree in Law. Upon returning to Colombia, he taught mercantile law, economy and political science.

Political career 

Urdaneta had a long relationship to former Presidents of Colombia. He was the son in law of President Carlos Holguín Mallarino, brother in law of president Jorge Holguín, and both nephews of President Manuel María Mallarino. Carlos Holguin had also been married to the sister of President Miguel Antonio Caro. Thus, his election as President was seen by many as the "continuance of a family tradition".

At an early age Urdaneta showed great interest for politics and he enlisted in the Colombian Conservative Party. He was elected to the city council of Bogotá, to the Assembly of Cundinamarca and to the House of Representatives several times. Later, he was designated as Permanent Representative of Colombia to the United Nations, and Ambassador to Perú and Argentina. Urdaneta was also appointed to the Ministries of Defense, Finance, and Foreign Affairs.

The Presidency  

Urdaneta became President of Colombia on November 5, 1951, when President Laureano Gómez became ill and had to resign from the presidency.

New congressional elections took place in 1951. The liberal party did not participate in this election, and thus, the composition of the new Congress was totally conservative. On October 30, 1951, the new Congress is sworn in, with the majority of members as followers of former president Mariano Ospina Pérez. On October 31, Congress is notified of the intentions of president Laureano Gómez to request leave of absence due to his illness. Congress moved promptly to elect a "Designado a la Presidencia" (interim president).

The candidate for the "Designatura" (office of interim president) with the majority of votes in Congress was Gilberto Alzate Avendaño, who happened to be the majority leader of Congress. Laureano Gómez opposed his nomination, and rather appealed for the candidacy of Roberto Urdaneta. Congress was persuaded by his impassionate appeal (the last wishes of a dying man), and elected Urdaneta as interim president. Thus, Urdaneta took the oath of President, before a joint session of Congress, on November 5, 1951.

By June 1953, President Laureano Gómez had recovered and was feeling better, and decided to regain control of the presidency. Before he did so, Gómez requested Urdaneta to remove General Gustavo Rojas Pinilla from his post as Chief of Staff of the Army. When Urdaneta failed to do so, Gómez showed up at the "Palacio de Nariño" (the presidents' palace), early in the morning of June 13, 1953, and proclaimed to be retaking his office as President.

Immediately after his announcement, Laureano Gómez left the "Palacio de Nariño". Urdaneta remained in the president's office. Within hours, that same afternoon, General Gustavo Rojas Pinilla, accompanied by other Generals of the Army's high command, presented himself before Urdaneta and stated: "In the name of the Army's high command, I have the charge to express to your Excellency that we are here to request that you continue acting as President of Colombia". Urdaneta, astonished, responded: "This morning I was removed from my post for not accepting an imposition, and now, I cannot retake it, as another imposition".

General Duarte Blum, on behalf of the high command, explained that it was not an imposition, but the honest desire of the Generals of the armed forces, whom did not have the administrative qualifications and experience that he had. General Rojas Pinilla pleaded with Urdaneta's wife, Clemencia Holguín, to try to persuade her husband to accept the Generals’ request. Urdaneta replied once again: "I am most grateful and moved by the Army's high command demonstration of trust and loyalty, but since this morning I am no longer the President, because Gómez has retaken his office. In order for me to accept your offer, President Gómez must resign again to his office".

General Rojas Pinilla had already ordered the mobilization of troops throughout Bogota and in major cities of the country. In light of Urdaneta's reluctance to accept the Army's request, General Rojas Pinilla proclaimed himself to be in charge of the office of the presidency.

References

External links
 Luis Angel Arango Library: Roberto Urdaneta Arbelaez biography

1890 births
1972 deaths
Politicians from Bogotá
Colombian people of Basque descent
Colombian Conservative Party politicians
Presidents of Colombia
Holguín family
Ambassadors of Colombia to Argentina
Ambassadors of Colombia to Peru
Permanent Representatives of Colombia to the United Nations
20th-century Colombian lawyers
Presidential Designates of Colombia
Colombian Ministers of War
Foreign ministers of Colombia
Colombian Ministers of Government
Ministers of Finance and Public Credit of Colombia